Miles Sandys may refer to:

 Miles Sandys (died 1601), English courtier and politician
 Miles Sandys (died 1636), English politician, grandson of Miles Sandys (died 1601)
 Sir Miles Sandys, 1st Baronet (1563–1645), English politician, nephew of Miles Sandys (died 1601)
 Sir Miles Sandys, 2nd Baronet (died 1654), son of the 1st Baronet

See also
Sandys (surname)